In  statistics, the size of a test is the probability of falsely rejecting the null hypothesis. That is, it is the probability of making a type I error. It is denoted by the Greek letter α (alpha). 

For a simple hypothesis,

In the case of a composite null hypothesis, the size is the supremum over all data generating processes that satisfy the null hypotheses.

In many cases the size and level of a test are equal.

References

Davidson, Russell, and James G. MacKinnon. Econometric theory and methods. Vol. 5. New York: Oxford University Press, 2004.
Statistical hypothesis testing